The coat of arms of Alberta, the heraldic symbol representing the Canadian province of Alberta, contains symbols reflecting Alberta's English heritage along with local symbols. The upper part of the shield features the  red cross of Saint George. The lower portion of the shield depicts the Rocky Mountains, grass prairies, and wheat fields - representing Alberta's landscape.

A  royal warrant of King Edward VII granted the original arms, consisting of only the shield, on May 30, 1907.
The arms were further augmented with supporters, a crest, and motto, by royal warrant of Queen Elizabeth II on July 30, 1980.

The shield, on a plain blue field, features in Alberta's provincial flag.

History
On 30 July 1980, Queen Elizabeth II augmented the armorial bearings by Royal Warrant with a crest, supporters, and a motto. The helmet under the crest was changed from a steel helmet to a gold royal helmet on 15 January 2008.

Symbolism

 Crest
 The crest sits above the shield and consists of a royal helmet crowned with a red and silver wreath, on top of which sits a beaver, resting on top of which is St Edward's Crown.  White and red are the official national colours of Canada, and the beaver is the official animal of Canada.
 Shield
 The shield represents the natural resources and beauty of the varied Alberta landscape: the Rocky Mountains and their foothills, the grass prairies, and the cultivated wheat fields. St George's Cross is an allusion to the arms of the Hudson's Bay Company, which once controlled what is now Alberta.
 Compartment
 The compartment or base is a grassy mount with wild roses, the official flower of Alberta.
 Supporters
 The supporters sit on either side of the shield and consist of a golden lion on the left (representing power) and a pronghorn on the right (representing Alberta's natural resources).  Neither of these is the official animal of Alberta (which is the bighorn sheep).
 Motto
, meaning "strong and free", a phrase from the English lyrics of "O Canada".

See also
Symbols of Alberta
Canadian heraldry
National symbols of Canada
List of Canadian provincial and territorial symbols
Heraldry

References

External links

 Government of Alberta, Community Development: Armorial Bearings

Provincial symbols of Alberta
Alberta
Alberta
Alberta
Alberta
Alberta
Alberta
Alberta
Alberta
Alberta